The Merthyr Tydfil by-election, 1888 could refer to:
March 1888 Merthyr Tydfil by-election
October 1888 Merthyr Tydfil by-election